

Events

Arts and literature
John H. Davis's Mafia Dynasty: The Rise and Fall of the Gambino Crime Family is published. 
Robert Rosenthal's Last Day of the Sicilians: The FBI's War Against the Mafia is published.
Little Odessa (film)
Pulp Fiction (film)

Births

Deaths
Joey Abate, Lucchese crime family capo 
John D'Arco, Sr., Chicago alderman associated with the Chicago Outfit
May 29 – John Tronolone "Peanuts", Cleveland mobster
June 4 – Gregory Scarpa "The Grim Reaper", Colombo crime family capo
October 2 – Carl Civella "Corky", Kansas City mobster   
October 2 – Milton Rockman, associate and brother-in-law to John Scalish 
October 19 – Frank Diecidue "Daddy Frank", Trafficante underboss
November 18 – Nicholas Bianco, Patriarca crime family underboss

Organized crime
Years in organized crime